Martin Schymainski (born. February 24, 1986) is a German professional ice hockey forward who currently plays for Krefelder EV 1981 U23 of the Oberliga (Germany3). On April 28, 2015, Schymainski signed a two-year contract extension to remain with Pinguine.

References

External links

1986 births
Living people
Augsburger Panther players
Füchse Duisburg players
German ice hockey forwards
Krefeld Pinguine players
Iserlohn Roosters players
EV Landsberg players
Löwen Frankfurt players
EHC München players
Sportspeople from Duisburg
Straubing Tigers players